Pinguosteus thulborni is a species of arthrodire placoderm from the Gogo Reef Formation, of Late Devonian Australia.  The proportions of its armor, coupled with the relative lack of otherwise diagnostic ornamentation on the armor make its classification difficult, and so it was placed as incertae sedis within the placoderm group Coccosteina. It is the only known species of the genus Pinguosteus.

Etymology
The generic name is a compound of the Latin words pinguis, meaning "fat," and os, meaning "bone," in allusion to the broad proportions of its armor plates.  The specific name commemorates Dr. Tony Thulborn.

References

 Long, J. A. 1990a, "Two new arthrodires (placoderm fishes) from the Upper Devonian Gogo Formation, Western Australia". Memoirs of the Queensland Museum  28, De Vis Symposium Volume, pp. 51–64.

Arthrodira enigmatic taxa
Placoderms of Australia
Gogo fauna
Fossil taxa described in 1990
Arthrodire genera